The 2001–02 Slovak 1.Liga season was the ninth season of the Slovak 1. Liga, the second level of ice hockey in Slovakia. 11 teams participated in the league, and HK VTJ Spisska Nova Ves won the championship.

Standings

External links
 Season on hockeyarchives.info

Slovak 1. Liga
Slovak 1. Liga seasons
Liga